Proserpinidae is a taxonomic family of small land snails with an operculum, gastropod mollusks in the superfamily Helicinoidea (according to the taxonomy of the Gastropoda by Bouchet & Rocroi, 2005).

This family has no subfamilies according to the taxonomy of the Gastropoda by Bouchet & Rocroi, 2005.

Genera 
Genera within the family Proserpinidae include:
 Proserpina G. B. Sowerby II, 1839 - type genus of the family

References 

 
Taxa named by John Edward Gray